Pyrochroa serraticornis, the cardinal beetle, is a species of fire-colored beetle in the family Pyrochroidae. It is found in Europe.

References

External links

 

Pyrochroidae
Beetles described in 1763